Tussio is a frazione of Prata d'Ansidonia, in the Province of L'Aquila in the Abruzzo, region of Italy.

Frazioni of the Province of L'Aquila
Prata d'Ansidonia